Arzate is a surname. Notable people with the surname include:
Memo Arzate (born 1981), American soccer player
Rafael Toribio Arzate (born 1958), Mexican footballer

Basque-language surnames